Barbara Vanderlinden (born 1965) is a Belgian art historian, curator, and director.

Early life and education 
Vanderlinden graduated with a MA in Philosophy at the Vrije Universiteit Brussel and an MA Art and art History at the Hoger Instituut voor Beeldende Kunsten, St Lukas Brussels.

Career 
Vanderlinden has been the curator of institutions and exhibitions in many countries, for which she has produced catalogue entries.

She began her career in 1991 as an assistant and adjunct curator at Antwerp Cultural Capital of Europe 1993 where she contributed to the contemporary art program, including three major exhibitions at the Royal Museum of Fine Arts, the Museum for Contemporary Art, and the Middelheim Open air Sculpture Museum (New Sculptures for Middelheim). 

From 1996 to 2006, she was founding director of Roomade, a Brussels-based arts organisation for contemporary art that commissioned and produced a string of notable exhibition projects, artworks and publications.

In 1998, she was appointed director of the contemporary art program at Antwerpen Open Vzw, where she was responsible for the contemporary art exhibitions of the Anton Van Dyck year, among others, the exhibition Laboratorium. In the same year, she curated the exhibition Fascinating Faces of Flanders 58/98 Two hours wide or two hours long at the Centro Cultural de Bélem during that year's Expo '98 (1998 Lisbon World Exposition), a project about art and society featuring artists from the 15th century to the 20th century, and contemporary period.

From 1998 to 2004, she was Vice President of the Contemporary Art Advisory Committee of the Ministry of Culture of the Flemish Community; she was he youngest and first female to be appointed.

From 1998 to 2004, she was a collaborator at Manifesta, The European Nomadic Biennial. In 1999, she was the co-curator of its second Manifesta 2 - European biennial of contemporary art in Luxembourg and was a member of the board of the Manifesta biennale in Amsterdam (2000–2004).

In 1999, she co-curated the exhibition Generation Z at MoMA PS1, an exhibition project exploring the attitudes of emerging artists at the end of the century from around the world.

In 2000, she curated an interdisciplinary exhibition and performance program for the Brussels 2000, European Capital of Culture, titled Indiscipline, including the projects Boris Groys: The Art Judgement Show and Carsten Höller: The Boudewijn Experiment (2000–2001). 

In 2001, she was appointed co-curator of the Bienal de Sao Paulo, and in 2004, she was curator of theTaipei Biennial 2004: Do You Believe In Reality?, Taipei. 

From 2006 to 2009, she was founding artistic director of the Brussels Biennial and artistic director for the first edition in 2008.

From 2005 to 2009, she was Founding Visiting Professor at the Gwangju Biennale International Curators Course, Associate Professor of curatorial studies for the CCS Bard Master of Arts Program in Curatorial Studies in Annandale-on-Hudson, New York, and Professor of Exhibition and Museum Studies (2005–08) at the San Francisco Art Institute.

She served as Founding Director of the Exhibition Laboratory and Professor of exhibition studies at Uniarts Helsinki, University of the Arts Helsinki where she curated the exhibition Laboratory of Hearing (2015).

Vanderlinden was the editor and co-author of the major source book The Manifesta Decade: Debates on Contemporary Art Exhibitions and Biennials in Post-Wall Europe (MIT Press, 2005) and co-author (with Francesco Bonami and Nancy Spector) of Maurizio Cattelan (Phaidon Press, 2003). 

In 2018, she was curator of A 37 90 89: Beyond the Museum (2018–2019) at the Museum for Contemporary Art in Antwerp. 

In 2019, she curated the first retrospective exhibition in Italy of Italian artist Mariella Simoni at MAMBo – Museo d’arte Moderna di Bologna (Mariella Simoni. 1975¬2018 ).

Roomade, 1995–2006 
In 1995, Vanderlinden founded the Brussels-based Roomade, "an organisation working with artists, philosophers and other intellectuals on projects that can hardly be commercialised or 'musealised'", "embedded in a specific social situation and intended for a new audience." 

The emergence of Roomade was directly linked to the finding that in the mid–1990s, Brussels lacked several vital functions and spaces for contemporary visual art. Roomade intended to fill this gap and take creative action on this terrain vague. 

From 1996 to 2006, Vanderlinden served as its founding director, a period during which the organisation commissioned and produced a string of notable exhibition projects. 

In its first year, Roomade started with the Office Tower Projects series (1996–1998) on several vacant floors of the Brussels' Manhattan Center: a megalomaniac metropolitan high-rise in the North district of Brussels that got out of hand. 

An early 1997 article in Knack described the organisation as follow: "Roomade rightly interpreted the core of the problem as an insane miscalculation of scale and formulated the subtitle of her Office Tower Manhattan Center Project as a counter-proposal: On the desperate and long neglected need for small events." 

Notable projects include Matt Mullican Under Hypnosis (1996), Boris Groys: The Art of Judgement Show (2000–2002), Carsten Höller: The Boudewijn Experiment (2000–2001); participating artists, among others, Raqs Media Collective, Tobias Rehberger, Anne Daems, Regina Möller, Andreas Slominski, Jan Fabre and Ilya Kabakov, Kobe Matthys, Gert Verhoeven, Carsten Höller, Boris Groys, Franciska Lambrechts and Honoré d’O, Nico Dockx, Stefano Boeri, Jean-Christophe Royoux and Caecilia Tripp, and Ana Torfs. 

Roomade lay also at the base and co-produced several large scale projects in Antwerp and Brussels, including, in 1999, Laboratorium (co-curated with Hans-Ulrich Obrist) and in 2000, Indiscipline (co-curated with Jens Hoffmann).

In 2006, the directors of Roomade transited the organisation to launch the first Brussels Biennial, after which the legal entity of Roomade ceased to exist.

References

External links 
 

1965 births
Living people
Belgian art critics
Belgian art curators
Belgian women curators
Belgian expatriates in Finland
Cultural historians
Women art critics
Vrije Universiteit Brussel alumni